Peter Michael Neumann (1931 – January 1, 2020) was a Canadian Football League player for 14 seasons the Hamilton Tiger-Cats. He was a 9-time CFL's Eastern All-Star and a part of three Grey Cup championship teams.

Neumann was inducted into the Canadian Football Hall of Fame in 1979. He died in 2020 at the age of 88–89 and laid to rest at Victoria Lawn Cemetery in St. Catharines.

References

Canadian Football Hall of Fame inductees
Canadian football defensive linemen
Hamilton Tiger-Cats players
Sportspeople from St. Catharines
Players of Canadian football from Ontario
1931 births
2020 deaths